The High School may refer to:

The High School, Dublin
High School of Dundee, in Dundee, Scotland
Royal High School, Edinburgh
High School of Glasgow

See also
High school (disambiguation)